Orleans Square is one of the 22 squares of Savannah, Georgia, United States. It is located in the middle row of the city's five rows of squares, on Barnard Street and West McDonough Street, and was laid out in 1815, shortly after the event it commemorates: General Andrew Jackson's victory at the Battle of New Orleans that January. It is south of Telfair Square, west of Chippewa Square and north of Pulaski Square. The oldest building on the square is the John Ash House, at 114–116 West Hull Street, which dates to 1817.

In the center of the square, the German Memorial Fountain honors early German immigrants to Savannah. Installed in 1989, it commemorates the 250th anniversary of Georgia and of Savannah, as well as the 300th anniversary of the arrival in Philadelphia of thirteen Rhenish families.

Dedication

Markers and structures

Constituent buildings

Each building below is in one of the eight blocks around the square composed of four residential "tything" blocks and four civic ("trust") blocks, now known as the Oglethorpe Plan. They are listed with construction years where known.

Northwestern residential/tything block

Oglethorpe House, 201 West Oglethorpe Avenue (1964) – formerly the Downtowner Motor Inn

Southwestern residential/tything block
Frederick Tebeau House, 101 West Perry Street (1836) – remodeled in 1876; moved from 16 West Liberty Street in the 1980s
John Martin/A.J. Miller Duplex, 105–107 West Perry Street (1872) – by DeWitt Bruyn
Laura Mehrtens House, 109 West Perry Street (1904)
Mordecai Myers House, 111 West Perry Street (1833) – third floor added c. 1880
Henry Hayme Duplex, 113–115 West Perry Street (1887) – by Calvin Fay and Alfred Eichberg
John Morel Property, 117–119 West Perry Street (1818) – remodeled in 1875

Northeastern residential/tything block
John Ash House, 114–116 West Hull Street (1817) – oldest building on the square

Southeastern civic/trust block

Harper Fowlkes House, 230 Barnard Street (1844)

Gallery

References

Orleans Square, Savannah
1815 establishments in Georgia (U.S. state)